Franconville may refer to the following French municipalities :

Franconville, Meurthe-et-Moselle, in the Meurthe-et-Moselle department
Franconville, Val-d'Oise, in the Val-d'Oise department
 Canton of Franconville